Martyrdom of Paul may refer to:
 Martyrdom of the Holy Apostle Paul, a section of the Acts of Paul
 The death of Paul the Apostle

See also
Saint Paul (disambiguation)#Martyrs

Paul the Apostle